Wadeline Jonathas (born February 19, 1998) is an American track and field athlete. She won gold medal in the women's 4x400 meters event at the 2019 World Athletics Championships and finished in 4th place in the 400 meters, in 49.60 seconds. Jonathas represents United States in women's 400 meters at the 2020 Tokyo Olympics.

Professional
Jonathas started a career in January 2020. In 2020, she achieved the world leading mark in the 400 meters, with a time of 51.32, set in the prelims of the Toyota USATF Indoor Championships. She ended up winning the final race in 51.54 seconds, and finished her indoor season undefeated in the 400 meters, with all her times under 52 seconds.

Competition record

NCAA
Jonathas enjoyed one of the best collegiate seasons in South Carolina Gamecocks track and field history in 2019. Jonathas claimed two NCAA Division I Track and field championships, in the indoor 4x400 meters, with a time of 3:30.76, and the outdoor 400 meters in 50.60 seconds. Jonathas proceeded to make the USATF roster for the 2019 IAAF World Championships and claimed 4th in the world in the 400m with the fastest collegiate time in history at 49.60 and then won a gold medal with Team USA in the women's 4x400m relay.

Jonathas won 2 titles (200 m, 400 m) at 2018 NCAA Division III Outdoor Track & Field Championships as a sophomore at UMass-Boston and finished 5th in long jump final. Jonathas won 4 titles (60 m, 200 m, 400 m, Long jump) at 2018 NCAA Division III Indoor Track & Field Championships as a sophomore at University of Massachusetts Boston.

Jonathas won 2 titles (200 m, 400 m) at 2017 NCAA Division III Outdoor Track & Field Championships as a freshman at UMass-Boston. Jonathas won her first National Collegiate Athletic Association title (400 m) while earning All-American honors in 200 metres and Long jump at 2017 NCAA Division III Indoor Track & Field Championships as a freshman at University of Massachusetts Boston.

Prep
Jonathas is a 2016 alumnae of Doherty Memorial High School in Worcester, Massachusetts. Jonathas placed 2nd at 2016 Massachusetts Interscholastic Athletic Association MIAA All State Track and field Championship in 400 m (55.81).

References

External links
 
  Wadeline Jonathas June 2021 conversation with Keeping Track Podcast
 Wadeline Jonathas, and this reminder: each event means *three* Olympic qualifiers 24 June 2021 story from 3 wire sports journalist Alan Abrahamson

1998 births
Living people
American female sprinters
World Athletics Championships athletes for the United States
World Athletics Championships medalists
World Athletics Championships winners
USA Indoor Track and Field Championships winners
University of Massachusetts Boston alumni
South Carolina Gamecocks women's track and field athletes
Athletes (track and field) at the 2020 Summer Olympics
Medalists at the 2020 Summer Olympics
Olympic gold medalists for the United States in track and field
Olympic female sprinters
21st-century American women
Doherty Memorial High School alumni